The stripe-breasted spinetail (Synallaxis cinnamomea) is a passerine bird found in the tropical New World in Trinidad, Tobago, Colombia and Venezuela. This species is a fairly common resident breeder in hill forest, and in Tobago also occurs in lowland and scrub habitats.

It is a member of the South American bird family Furnariidae, a group in which many species build elaborate clay nests, giving rise to the English name for the family of "ovenbirds".

However, stripe-breasted spinetail constructs a spherical stick nest with a tubular entrance low in a bush, into which its two greenish white eggs are laid.

The stripe-breasted spinetail is typically 14 cm long, and weighs 16 g. It is a slender bird with a longish tail. The upperparts and head are dark brown, and the wings are chestnut. The throat is white streaked with black, and the rest of the underparts are dark-streaked buff.

The sexes are similar, but there are several races.  S. c. aveledoi is paler, S. c. striatipectus is darker and S. c. bolivari is whiter with a less streaked throat. The Tobago form S. c. terrestrisi is large and pale, and S. c. carri on Trinidad is dark and lightly streaked.

Stripe-breasted spinetail is an insectivore which is often difficult to see as it forages in undergrowth, but may be located by its calls, a querulous  chew or a high-pitched nasal .

References 

stripe-breasted spinetail
Birds of the Colombian Andes
Birds of the Venezuelan Andes
Birds of the Venezuelan Coastal Range
Birds of Trinidad and Tobago
stripe-breasted spinetail